Nurhidayat Haji Haris (born 5 April 1999) is an Indonesian professional footballer who plays as a centre back or right back for Liga 1 club Bhayangkara.

Club career

PSM Makassar 
Nurhidayat in 2017 started his professional career at his hometown club PSM Makassar and played in the 2017 Liga 1 competition. At the end of the season, he moved to the 2017 Liga 1 champion Bhayangkara. He returned to PSM in early 2021.

Bhayangkara 
In 2018, he signed a two-season contract with Liga 1 club Bhayangkara. Nurhidayat debuted for this police-supported team on 23 March 2018 in the first match of the 2018 Liga 1 season. He was a regular for the club in the two seasons he was there, appearing in 29 matches.

Return to PSM Makassar
On early 2021, Nurhidayat returned to hometown club PSM Makassar. on his second spell with the club, he didn't make a single appearance. subsequently he moved to Liga 2 side PSG Pati.

PSG Pati
In June 2021, Nurhidayat signed a contract with Indonesian Liga 2 club PSG Pati. He made his league debut on 4 October against PSCS Cilacap at the Manahan Stadium, Surakarta. Nurhidayat played five times for PSG Pati in 2021 Liga 2 without scoring a goal.

PSIM Yogyakarta
He was signed for PSIM Yogyakarta to play in the second round of Liga 2 in the 2021 season. Nurhidayat made his debut on 27 December 2021 in a 3–0 loss against RANS Cilegon as a substitute for Sunni Hizbullah in the 73rd minute at the Pakansari Stadium, Cibinong. Nurhidayat played two times for PSIM in 2021 Liga 2 without scoring a goal.

International career
On 31 May 2017, Nurhidayat debuted for the Indonesia national under-19 football team in a match against the Brazil U20 team in the 2017 Toulon Tournament in France. Nurhidayat captained the Indonesia U19 team in the 2018 AFC U-19 Championship.

Nurhidayat was part of the Indonesia under-23 team that won silver in the 2019 Southeast Asian Games in the Philippines. He received his first call to join the senior Indonesia national football team in May 2021. He earned his first senior cap in a 25 May 2021 friendly match in Dubai against Afghanistan.

Career statistics

Club

International

Honours

International 
Indonesia U-19
 AFF U-19 Youth Championship third place: 2017, 2018
Indonesia U-23
 AFF U-22 Youth Championship: 2019
 Southeast Asian Games  Silver medal: 2019

References

External links
 Nurhidayat Haris at Soccerway
 

1999 births
Living people
Sportspeople from Makassar
Sportspeople from South Sulawesi
Indonesian footballers
PSM Makassar players
Bhayangkara F.C. players
PSIM Yogyakarta players
PSG Pati players
Liga 1 (Indonesia) players
Liga 2 (Indonesia) players
Indonesia youth international footballers
Indonesia international footballers
Association football defenders
Competitors at the 2019 Southeast Asian Games
Southeast Asian Games silver medalists for Indonesia
Southeast Asian Games medalists in football